Lister Glacier is a glacier  long and  wide, draining the northeast slopes of Stribog Mountains and flowing into Bouquet Bay just south of Duclaux Point on the northeast side of Brabant Island, in the Palmer Archipelago, Antarctica.

The glacier was shown on an Argentine government chart in 1953, but not named. It was photographed by Hunting Aerosurveys Ltd in 1956–57, and mapped from these photos in 1959. It was named by the UK Antarctic Place-Names Committee for Joseph Lister, 1st Baron Lister, an English surgeon who was the founder of antiseptic surgery.

See also
 List of glaciers in the Antarctic
 Glaciology

Maps
 Antarctic Digital Database (ADD). Scale 1:250000 topographic map of Antarctica. Scientific Committee on Antarctic Research (SCAR). Since 1993, regularly upgraded and updated.
British Antarctic Territory. Scale 1:200000 topographic map. DOS 610 Series, Sheet W 64 62. Directorate of Overseas Surveys, Tolworth, UK, 1980.
Brabant Island to Argentine Islands. Scale 1:250000 topographic map. British Antarctic Survey, 2008.

Further reading 
 Geological Survey (U.S.), Coastal-change and Glaciological Map of the Trinity Peninsula Area and South Shetland Islands, P 28

External links 

 Lister Glacier on USGS website
 Lister Glacier on SCAR website
 Lister Glacier Copernix satellite image

References

Glaciers of the Palmer Archipelago
Brabant Island

zh:利斯特冰川